Lajes is Portuguese for "covering of flat rock", or "flagstone", and may refer to:

Places

Brazil
Lajes, Rio Grande do Norte, Rio Grande do Norte
Lages, Santa Catarina, Brazil
Lajes Pintadas, Rio Grande do Norte

Portugal
Lajes (Seia), a civil parish in the municipality of Seia

Archipelago of the Azores 
Lajes das Flores, a municipality on the island of Flores
Lajes das Flores (parish), a civil parish and the municipal seat of the municipality of Lajes das Flores
Lajes do Pico (Azores), a municipality along the southern coast of the island of Pico
Lajes do Pico (Azores), a civil parish and the municipal seat of the municipality of Lajes do Pico
Lajes (Praia da Vitória), a civil parish in the municipality of Praia da Vitória, Terceira

Other uses 
Lajes Field, a multi-use air field and regional air passenger terminal located near Lajes on Terceira Island in the Azores, Portugal
Ribeirão das Lajes, a river in Rio de Janeiro state in southeastern Brazil

See also
 Lages, a municipality in Santa Catarina, Brazil